Joseph Stephens is an American musician.

Joseph or Joe Stephens may also refer to:
Joe Stephens (footballer) (1887–1935), Australian rules footballer
Joe Stephens (journalist), American journalist
Joe Stephens (mayor), American politician
Joe Stephens (basketball) (born 1973), American basketball player
Joseph Rayner Stephens (1805–1879), Methodist minister

See also
Joseph Stevens (disambiguation)